Farakka Barrage is a barrage across the Ganga river located in Murshidabad district in the Indian state of West Bengal, roughly  from the border with Bangladesh near Shibganj. Farakka Barrage Township is located in Farakka (community development block) in Murshidabad district. Construction of the Farakka barrage started in 1962, was completed in 1970 at a cost of $208 million. Operations began on 21 April 1975.

Geography

Location

Note: The two maps present some of the notable locations in the subdivision. All places marked in the maps are linked in the larger full screen maps.

Purpose 
The barrage was constructed by Hindustan Construction Company. Out of 109 gates, 108 are over the river and the 109th one over the low-lying land in Malda, as a precaution. The Barrage serves water to the Farakka Super Thermal Power Station. There are also sixty small canals which can divert some water to other destinations for drinking purposes etc.

The purpose of the barrage is to divert  of water from the Ganges to the Hooghly River for flushing out sediment deposition from Kolkata harbour without the need of regular mechanical dredging. After commissioning the project, it was found that the diverted water flow from the Farakka barrage was not adequate to flush the sediment from the river satisfactorily. In addition, there are regular land/bank collapses in to the Ganga river due to the high level back waters of the Farakka barrage. Substantial high land is already converted into low level river bed causing displacement of huge populations. The water diverted from the Farakka barrage is less than 10% of Ganga river water available at Farakka.

Farakka water sharing treaty
As per the treaty between India and Bangladesh, signed in 1996, for sharing of the Ganges water at Farakka, the division is as follows:

Impact

The Ganges is one of the major rivers of the world. About 70% of the total population of Bangladesh and about 50% of the Indian population live in the Ganges basin; 43% of the total irrigated area in India is also in the Ganges basin and there are about 100 urban settlements with a total population of about 120 million on its banks. As a result, Bangladesh and India have had many debates about how the Farakka Barrage cuts off Bangladesh's water supply and how to share the water. Right from the beginning, this created a concern for Bangladesh as it constitutes the low-lying part of the Gangetic valley. After the completion of the barrage at the end of 1975, it was agreed to run it with specified discharges for a period of 41 days from 21 April to 31 May during the remaining period of the dry season of 1975 under an accord announced as a joint press release on 18 April 1975. But after the assassination of Sheikh Mujibur Rahman on 15 August 1975, relations between the two countries became greatly strained and India continued to withdraw water even after the agreed period. The diversions led to a crisis situation in Bangladesh in the dry season of 1976. In 1977, Bangladesh went to the United Nations and lodged a formal protest against India with the General Assembly of The United Nations, which adopted a consensus statement on 26 November 1976. Talks between the two countries were resumed in December 1976. No consensus was reached.

Twenty years later, in 1996, a 30-year agreement was signed. It did not contain any guarantee clause for unconditional minimum amounts of water to be supplied to Bangladesh or India, nor could the future hydrological parameters taken into account as is always the case when water resources are planned on historic data series. As a result, the agreement is sometimes perceived to be failed by some sections in Bangladesh to provide the expected result.  Constant monitoring of the implementation of negotiations in lean season continue to the present today. In Bangladesh, it is perceived that the diversion has raised salinity levels, contaminated fisheries, hindered navigation, and posed a threat to water quality and public health. Lower levels of soil moisture along with increased salinity have also led to desertification. However, this barrage still has significant effect on the mutual relation of these two neighboring countries.

Farakka barrage has been criticized for the floods in Bihar as it is causing excessive siltation in the Ganga.

See also

 Farakka Super Thermal Power Station
 Farakka Long March (1976 protest)
 Ganges Barrage Project
 Sharing the water of the Ganges
 River bank erosion along the Ganges in Malda and Murshidabad districts
 Indian Rivers Inter-link 
 Kalpasar Project
 List of longest bridges in the world
 List of longest bridges above water in India

References 

Dams in West Bengal
Barrages in India
Bangladesh–India relations
Water and politics
Buildings and structures in Murshidabad district
Bridges over the Ganges
1972 establishments in West Bengal
Dams completed in 1972
Railway bridges in West Bengal
20th-century architecture in India